Bengt Idestam-Almquist (9 September 1895 – 16 September 1983) was a Swedish screenwriter, critic and film historian. The Swedish Film Institute calls him the "father of Swedish film criticism". At the 3rd Guldbagge Awards he won a Special Achievement award. He was a member of the jury at the 15th Venice International Film Festival in 1954.

Idestam-Almquist, who was the son of a Riksvensk father and a Swedish-speaking Finn mother, was born in Turku, Finland, and grew up in Saint Petersburg, Russian Empire. He later fled to Sweden with his family during the February Revolution and studied art history in Uppsala. His fascination with film came after watching a silent film with a benshi while serving the Red Cross in Asia.

He was awarded the Illis quorum in 1983.

Selected filmography 
 A Crime (1940)
 A Real Man (1940)
 The Three of Us (1940)
 Life Goes On (1941)
 The Poor Millionaire (1941)

References

External links

1895 births
1983 deaths
Swedish male screenwriters
People from Turku
20th-century Swedish screenwriters
20th-century Swedish male writers
Naturalized citizens of Sweden
Swedish people of Finnish descent
Swedish-speaking Finns
Recipients of the Illis quorum
Emigrants from the Russian Empire to Sweden